Ondřej Sukup (born 8 December 1988) is a Czech professional footballer who plays as a right back for FK Blansko.

He had previously played for Znojmo, Sigma Olomouc and Baník Ostrava.

References

External links
 

1988 births
Living people
Czech footballers
Czech First League players
Czech National Football League players
First Professional Football League (Bulgaria) players
1. FC Slovácko players
1. SC Znojmo players
FC Zbrojovka Brno players
SK Sigma Olomouc players
FC Baník Ostrava players
PFC Cherno More Varna players
FK Blansko players
Czech expatriate footballers
Czech expatriate sportspeople in Bulgaria
Expatriate footballers in Bulgaria
Association football fullbacks